Bartosz Bajorek (born 22 January 2004) is a Polish footballer who plays as a forward for Stal Mielec.

Career statistics

Club

Notes

References 

2004 births
Living people
Polish footballers
Association football forwards
Stal Mielec players
I liga players